Van Buren Township is one of eleven townships in Clay County, Indiana. As of the 2010 census, its population was 3,528 and it contained 1,448 housing units.

History
Van Buren Township was established in the late 1830s. It was named for Martin Van Buren, the ninth Vice President of the United States. There is also a Dick Johnson Township in Clay County in honor of Richard Mentor Johnson, Van Buren's vice president.

Eaglefield Place was listed on the National Register of Historic Places in 1998.

Geography

Cities and towns
 Carbon
 Harmony
 Knightsville

Unincorporated towns
 Benwood
 Calcutta
 Cardonia
 Lena
 Mechanicsburg
 Pontiac
(This list is based on USGS data and may include former settlements.)

Adjacent townships
 Jackson Township, Parke County (north)
 Madison Township, Putnam County (northeast)
 Washington Township, Putnam County (east)
 Jackson Township (south)
 Brazil Township (southwest)
 Dick Johnson Township (west)
 Raccoon Township, Parke County (northwest)

Major highways
  U.S. Route 40
  State Road 59

Cemeteries
The township contains five cemeteries: Calcutta, Pell, Pell, Poff and Roberts.

References
 United States Census Bureau cartographic boundary files
 U.S. Board on Geographic Names

External links

 Indiana Township Association
 United Township Association of Indiana

Townships in Clay County, Indiana
Terre Haute metropolitan area
Townships in Indiana
1830s establishments in Indiana
Populated places established in the 1830s